Qingyan (Yan) Chen is the Director of the PolyU Academy for Interdisciplinary Research (PAIR) and Chair Professor  at The Hong Kong Polytechnic University, active in the field of building science. He is Professor Emeritus of Mechanical Engineering at Purdue University in the United States. He is the editor-in-chief of the academic journal Building and Environment.

Biography 
Chen earned a Bachelor of Engineering in 1983 from Tsinghua University in China, and a Master's (1985) and Ph.D. (1988) from the Delft University of Technology in the Netherlands. Prior to joining Purdue University, where he is currently a professor of mechanical engineering, he completed a post-doctoral fellowship at the ETH Zurich; worked as a project manager for the Netherlands Organisation for Applied Scientific Research; and was on the faculty at Delft University of Technology and the Massachusetts Institute of Technology.

Chen's research interests include indoor environments; aircraft cabin environments; and energy-efficient, healthy, and sustainable building design and analysis. Chen was ranked No. 10454 in all the disciplines in the world and No. 12 in “Building and Construction” field by Stanford University in 2021 among the top 2 percent of the most-cited scientists in various disciplines. His publications have been cited by nearly 20,000 times and his H-index is 74, according to GoogleScholar.

In 1996, Chen received a National Science Foundation CAREER Award, given to outstanding junior faculty. In 2007, the Institute of Environmental Sciences and Technology honoured him with the Willis J. Whitfield Award "for significant contributions to the field of contamination control through numerous published papers, studies, and reports". In 2011, Scandinavian Federation of Heating, Ventilating and Sanitary Engineering Associations in Denmark, Finland, Iceland, Norway and Sweden (SCANVAC) awarded him John Rydberg Gold Medal for “outstanding contribution to the advancement of modelling and measurement of ventilation and air distribution in buildings”. In 2013, Chen earned the Award for Distinguished Service to Building Simulation from the International Building Performance Simulation Association. In 2021, the Hong Kong government awarded him Global STEM Professorship.

Chen's research results have been reported by TV stations such as CNN, Fox, ABC, BBC, Deutsche Welle, ARD, and NOS and newspapers, such as Washington Post, The New York Times, The Wall Street Journal, The Guardian, etc. CCTV 4 "Chinese World" had Prof. Chen's documentary "Chen Qingyan from a Farmer to a Scientist" in two episodes. See  and.

See also 

 Building science
 Computational fluid dynamics in buildings

References 

Living people
Year of birth missing (living people)
Purdue University faculty
Chinese mechanical engineers
Academic staff of Hong Kong Polytechnic University
Delft University of Technology alumni
Academic staff of the Delft University of Technology
MIT School of Engineering faculty
21st-century engineers